Crescent Park Elementary School may refer to:

An elementary school in Maine School Administrative District 44, Maine, United States
An elementary school in School District 36 Surrey, Surrey, British Columbia, Canada